= Pre-Christian =

Pre-Christian may refer to:

- Before Christianization (the spread of Christianity):
  - Historical polytheism (the worship of or belief in multiple deities)
  - Judaism (the first monotheistic religion)
  - Historical paganism (denoting various non-Abrahamic religions)
- Before Christ (BC), the era before the year 1 in the Julian and Gregorian calendars
  - Classical antiquity, a period of history centered on the Mediterranean Sea, lasting from around the 8th century BC to the 5th century AD
  - Iron Age, lasting from around the 12th century BC to the 8th century AD
